William Hershel Lattimore (May 25, 1884 – October 30, 1919), nicknamed "Slothful Bill", was a Major League Baseball pitcher who played for one season. He pitched in four games for the Cleveland Naps during the 1908 Cleveland Naps season.

External links

1884 births
1919 deaths
Cleveland Naps players
Major League Baseball pitchers
Baseball players from Texas
Minor league baseball managers
Webb City Goldbugs players
Toledo Mud Hens players
Fort Worth Panthers players